Hatsu Ando (20 January 1912 – 4 December 1985) was a Japanese politician. She was one of the first group of women elected to the House of Representatives in 1946.

Biography
Hatsu Sen was born in Nirayama in 1912. She became a member of the New Japan Cultural Association and served as president of the Shin-Etsu Industrial Company. The couple moved to Nagano Prefecture during World War II.

In 1946 Ando contested the Nagano constituency in the general elections as a candidate of the Peace Party, and was elected to the House of Representatives. After being elected, she joined the National Cooperative Party. She lost her seat in the 1947 elections.

Ando subsequently lived in the suburbs of Tokyo until her death in 1985.

References

1912 births
People from Shizuoka Prefecture
Japanese schoolteachers
Japanese women educators
20th-century Japanese women politicians
20th-century Japanese politicians
Members of the House of Representatives (Japan)
National Cooperative Party politicians
1985 deaths